Just Sing is a karaoke video game developed by iNiS and published by Ubisoft, which was released for PlayStation 4 and Xbox One on September 6, 2016 as a spin-off title to the Just Dance series. After only 18 months Ubisoft announced they will pull the plug on the online features of Just Sing in June 2018 leaving those that purchased the game with just the core base game to play. Those that bought extra packs have been directed to Ubisoft support for compensation, amounts will be updated here once known.

Gameplay 
Just Sing is divided into "Party" and "Battle" modes; Party mode allows players to record lip sync music videos, while Battle is a competitive mode. The game supports the use of a companion mobile app for Android and iOS smartphones, which utilizes the device's internal microphone and camera in-game (as opposed to a wired USB microphone). Kinect and PlayStation Camera can also be used to record video footage.

Soundtrack

The following songs are contained within the game:

Ubisoft Connect Unlockables

DLC

References

2016 video games
Karaoke video games
Ubisoft games
Kinect games
PlayStation 4 games
Video games developed in Japan
Xbox One games